Jan Michał, 6th Chevalier de Weryha-Wysoczański-Pietrusiewicz (born 1 October 1950), known as Jan de Weryha-Wysoczański, is a Polish sculptor, process artist and concrete artist. 
He was born in Gdańsk. From 1971 to 1976 he studied sculpture at the Academy of Fine Arts in Gdańsk. Since 1981, he has been living and working in Hamburg. In 1998, he won the 1st prize, the Prix du Jury, awarded by the Ministry of Culture of the Grand Duchy of Luxembourg at the 'Salon de Printemps 98', Luxembourg. In 1999, he created a monument in memory of the deportees of the 1944 Warsaw Uprising for the memorial to the victims of the Neuengamme Nazi concentration camp at Hamburg, in 2012 a memorial for the Nazi forced labourers in Hamburg-Bergedorf. He was represented by Galerie Kellermann in Düsseldorf. In 2022 de Weryha-Wysoczański was awarded in Vienna the Golden Owl culture award in the category Visual Arts.

He comes from an old noble family of Walachian boyar stock and legend has it that his coat of arms is borne by the descendants of Attila the Hun. His only son Rafael is a writer, his uncle Basil was a rich 19th century philanthropist. A son of his aunt Anna was composer Yaroslav Yaroslavenko. Another cousin was industrialist, novelist and playwright Bronislas, 3rd Chevalier de Minkowicz-Wysoczański.

Works in museum collections
Centre of Polish Sculpture, Orońsko, Poland
National Museum, Szczecin, Poland
Museum of Contemporary Art, Radom, Poland

Sammlung de Weryha
Hamburg is the location of the "Sammlung de Weryha", which is based in the former depository of the palace museum Hamburg-Bergedorf. Most of the collection, composed of works by the artist and supported by a Friends organisation, is permanently being on display in the exhibition rooms.

Exhibitions (selection)
 1978 60th Anniversary of the Greater Poland Uprising in Art, City Gallery BWA Arsenał, Poznań
 1989 Autumn Salon, Kunsthaus Hamburg, Hamburg
 1990 Germany in Montana, Gallery of Visual Arts, Missoula, Montana
 1993 Selected Art Work from the Federal Republic of Germany and The United States: A Traveling Exhibition, Paris Gibson Square Museum of Art, Great Falls, Montana
 1998 Spring Salon '98, Luxembourg Artist Center, Municipal Theater, Luxembourg
 2004 Strictly Wood. Heiner Szamida, Helga Weihs, Jan de Weryha, Kunsthalle Wilhelmshaven, Wilhelmshaven
 2004 Jan de Weryha-Wysoczański – Wooden Cube from the Wooden Cube Series, Chapel Gallery, Polish Sculpture Center, Orońsko
 2005 Jan de Weryha-Wysoczański – Epiphanies of Nature in the Late-Modern World, Szyb Wilson Gallery, Katowice
 2005 Jan de Weryha-Wysoczański – Wood – Archive, Patio Gallery, Łódź
 2006 Jan de Weryha-Wysoczański – Revelations in Wood – Orońsko 2006, Museum of Contemporary Sculpture, Orońsko
 2006 XV International Sculpture Triennial – Sensitivity, "Zamek" Culture Center, Poznań
 2006 Jan de Weryha-Wysoczański – Revelations in Wood, City Gallery BWA, Jelenia Góra
 2008 Alphabet of the Sculpture DEF..., Museum of Contemporary Sculpture, Orońsko
 2009 Jan de Weryha-Wysoczański – Tabularium, Gdańsk City Gallery, Gdańsk
 2009 XVI International Sculpture Triennial – Crisis of the Genre, "Zamek" Culture Center, Poznań
 2010 Wood as Sculpture Material, Museum of Contemporary Sculpture, Orońsko
 2011 Hamburg Art Week 2011, Chilehaus, Hamburg
 2013 NordArt 2013, Carlshütte, Büdelsdorf
 2013 PROJECT BERLIN RELOAD, FACTORY-ART GALLERY, Berlin
 2015 Alphabet of the Sculpture VWZŹ..., Museum of Contemporary Sculpture, Orońsko
 2015 Mailights 2015: Günther Uecker, Otto Piene, Heinz Mack, Jan de Weryha, Manfred Binzer, Galerie Kellermann, Düsseldorf
 2018 Wood Sculpture in the Work of Polish Artists 1918-2018, Władysław Count Zamoyski City Gallery in Zakopane, among others from the collections of the Zachęta National Gallery of Art, Warsaw, and the State Art Gallery, Sopot
 2021 Kunst Schaffen, Robbe & Berking Yachting Heritage Centre, Flensburg, with Klaus Fußmann, Ingo Kühl among others.

Gallery

References

Bibliography

 Axel Feuß: Weryha-Wysoczański, Jan de, in: Allgemeines Künstlerlexikon. Die Bildenden Künstler aller Zeiten und Völker (AKL), vol. 116, Berlin, Boston: de Gruyter 2022, pp. 2-3, .

External links

Works by or about Jan de Weryha-Wysoczański in libraries (WorldCat catalogue)
Jisc Library Hub Discover
Newton Library Catalogue, University of Cambridge
Sammlung de Weryha
Freundeskreis der Sammlung de Weryha
Jan de Weryha-Wysoczański at the Porta Polonica Documentation Centre

1950 births
Polish contemporary artists
20th-century German sculptors
20th-century German male artists
German male sculptors
21st-century German sculptors
21st-century German male artists
Living people
Polish sculptors
Polish male sculptors
Jan
Academy of Fine Arts in Gdańsk alumni